Trstěnice is a municipality and village in Cheb District in the Karlovy Vary Region of the Czech Republic. It has about 400 inhabitants.

Administrative parts
The village of Horní Ves is an administrative part of Trstěnice.

References

Villages in Cheb District